Operation Guardian was a series of 14 nuclear tests conducted by the United States in 1980–1981 at the Nevada Test Site. These tests followed the Operation Tinderbox series and preceded the Operation Praetorian series.

References

Explosions in 1980
Explosions in 1981
1980 in military history
1981 in military history
Guardian